George Witt may refer to:

 George Witt (baseball) (1933–2013), American baseball player
 George Witt (collector) (1804–1869), doctor, banker and mayor known for his collection of erotic objects
 George Witt (politician) (1863–1925), American politician in the state of Washington